Paulo José de Oliveira (born 9 March 1986), commonly known as Paulinho Guerreiro or simply Paulinho, is a Brazilian professional footballer who plays as a forward for São José.

Having previously spent ten seasons at BK Häcken in the Swedish Allsvenskan, Paulinho is the club's all-time leading scorer with 113 goals in all competitions.

Career

BK Häcken and Örebro SK
In the summer of 2007, Paulinho left his native Brazil and joined BK Häcken in Superettan, Sweden's second tier. In 2008, his second season with the club, BK Häcken got promoted to Allsvenskan. He played for the club for two more seasons in the first division, scoring 15 goals in 50 games, before leaving at the end of 2010.

In March 2011, Paulinho moved to Örebro SK in Allsvenskan, after failing to secure a contract elsewhere in Europe. He played 19 games for the club throughout the season, scoring four goals, but left for his native Brazil at the end of the year due to personal reasons. His contract with Örebro SK was terminated in early 2012 by mutual consent.

Years in Brazil
Back in Brazil, Paulinho represented São José, Bragantino, Paraná and Piracicaba between 2012 and 2015. He also had a brief spell at Al Dhafra in the UAE Pro League.

Return to BK Häcken
On 15 April 2015, at age 29, Paulinho returned to BK Häcken in Allsvenskan. He immediately made an impact back at his former club, scoring 11 goals in 14 league games in the 2015 Allsvenskan.

In 2016, Paulinho was plagued by injuries, but scored nine goals in just 11 league games. He scored a penalty when BK Häcken won the 2015–16 Svenska Cupen on 5 May, the club's first ever domestic title, beating Malmö FF in the final after a 2–2 draw (5–6 on penalties).

In 2017, Paulinho scored nine goals in 25 games, as BK Häcken finished fourth in the Allsvenskan table. At the end of the season, on 21 December, he signed a new two-year contract with the club.

In 2018, Paulinho was the Allsvenskan top scorer, scoring 20 goals in 27 league games, as BK Häcken finished fifth in the table. At the end of the year, he was named the Most valuable player and Forward of the year in Allsvenskan.

In 2019, Paulinho scored 11 goals in 21 league games, as the club finished sixth in the Allsvenskan table. The club won the 2018–19 Svenska Cupen on 30 May, beating AFC Eskilstuna in the final after a 3–0 win. On 1 September, Paulinho became BK Häcken's all-time leading scorer with 113 goals in all competitions.

At the end of 2019, Paulinho left BK Häcken and signed a one and half-year contract with Hapoel Be'er Sheva in the Israeli Premier League.

Hammarby IF
On 24 January 2020, Paulinho returned to Sweden, after terminating his contract with Hapoel Be'er Sheva before making any appearances. He signed a two-year deal with Hammarby IF, sought out as a replacement for Nikola Đurđić. In a debut season plagued by injuries, Paulinho scored just three goals in 16 league games for his side, as Hammarby disappointedly finished in eight place in Allsvenskan. Paulinho scored in the first round of the 2020–21 UEFA Europa League against Puskás Akadémia (in a 3–0 win), before the club was eliminated from the tournament in the second round against Lech Poznań (in a 0–3 loss).

On 30 May 2021, Paulinho won the 2020–21 Svenska Cupen, the main domestic cup, with Hammarby through a 5–4 win on penalties (0–0 after full-time) against his former club BK Häcken in the final, where he scored his attempt. After recovering from an injury, Paulinho featured in the second leg as the club was knocked out in the play-off round of the 2021–22 UEFA Europa Conference League by Basel (4–4 on aggregate) after a penalty shoot-out, in which he missed his attempt. At the end of the year, it was announced that Paulinho would leave the club at the expiration of his contract.

Return to Brazil
On 7 January 2022, Paulinho returned to Brazil, signing with São José, making a third stint at his first professional club.

Career statistics

Honours
BK Häcken
 Svenska Cupen: 2015–16, 2018–19

Hammarby IF
 Svenska Cupen: 2020–21

Individual
Svenska Cupen Top goalscorer: 2015–16
 Allsvenskan Top goalscorer: 2018
 Allsvenskan Most Valuable Player: 2018
 Allsvenskan Forward of the Year: 2018

References

External links 
 

1986 births
Living people
Brazilian footballers
Association football forwards
São José Esporte Clube players
Democrata Futebol Clube players
Paraná Clube players
BK Häcken players
Örebro SK players
Al Dhafra FC players
Hapoel Be'er Sheva F.C. players
Hammarby Fotboll players
Superettan players
Allsvenskan players
Campeonato Brasileiro Série B players
UAE Pro League players
Brazilian expatriate footballers
Brazilian expatriate sportspeople in Sweden
Expatriate footballers in Sweden
Brazilian expatriate sportspeople in the United Arab Emirates
Expatriate footballers in the United Arab Emirates
People from São José dos Campos
Footballers from São Paulo (state)